"I'm No Angel" is a song by American singer Marcella Detroit, released in July 1994 through London Records as the third UK single and second Australian single from her album Jewel. The two-part CD single release contains five B-sides, with only one track, "Cool People", appearing on Jewel.

Track listings 
 CD single 1
"I'm No Angel" — 4:14
"You Own the Moon" — 4:13
"Cool People" — 3:32

 CD single 2
"I'm No Angel" — 4:14
"Lay Down Sally" — 4:10
"Crucify Me" — 3:51
"Monday Morning" — 4:12

Charts

References 

1994 singles
1994 songs
London Records singles
Marcella Detroit songs
Song recordings produced by Chris Thomas (record producer)
Songs written by Marcella Detroit